T. Ram Mohan Reddy is an Indian politician from the Indian National Congress party. He is an elected Member of Legislative assembly from Parigi Assembly constituency of Telangana in 2014. He secured 68,098 votes in the 2014 Telangana Assembly elections. He was the Whip of the Congress party in the first Telangana legislative assembly. In 2018, he provided free coaching to the people of his assembly constituency who are preparing for the state constable and VRO exams along with free coaching material and lunches. In 2020, he has become convener of PCC Committee for agitation against Pothireddypadu lift irrigation project.

References 

Telangana politicians
Telangana MLAs 2014–2018
Living people
Year of birth missing (living people)